Peter Mof(f)at(t) or Moffett may refer to:

 Peter Moffat (born 1962), English playwright and screenwriter
 Peter Moffatt (1922–2007), English television director
 Peter Moffett (drummer), for the bands Government Issue and Wool
 Peter Davison, real name Peter Moffett, (born 1951), British actor